Mieczysław Bagiński (born August 15, 1944 in Koniecki Małe) – Polish politician, local official, former Voivode of Łomża Voivodeship.

Biography 
From 1992 to 1994 he was the vice-voivode of Łomża Voivodeship, then he obtainend the voivode office (1994-1997).

He was ZSL activist. He belongs to the Polish People's Party (PSL). From the list of this party in 1998 he became a councilor of the Podlaskie Regional Assembly. He successfully applied for re-election in 2002, 2006 and early elections in 2007, after which he assumed the seat of chairman of the regional council. In 2010 and in 2014, he won a mandate for next terms. In 2018 he did not apply for re-election.

Bagiński unsuccessfully ran in 1997, 2003, 2007, 2011, 2015 and 2016 to the Senate, in 2005 to the Sejm and in 2009 to the European Parliament.

References 

1944 births
Living people
Polish People's Party politicians
People from Grajewo County
Polish schoolteachers